

Events
 End of reign of Rudamun, Pharaoh of the Twenty-third dynasty of Egypt (757–754 BC)
 Start of reign of Iuput, Pharaoh of the Twenty-third dynasty of Egypt (754–715 BC)

Births

Deaths

References

750s BC